Matthew George Timothy Needham (born 13 April 1984) is a British actor. He has worked on stage and screen, appearing in television series such as Casualty, Endeavour, and Sanditon. For his performance in the play Britannicus, he was nominated the 2011 Ian Charleson Award. 

As of 2022, Needham portrays Larys Strong on the HBO fantasy series House of the Dragon. His performance in the series has received critical acclaim.

Early life
He graduated with a Bachelor of Arts in Acting from the London Academy of Music and Dramatic Art in 2007.

Career 

Needham has performed on stage for the Royal Shakespeare Company, Royal Court Theatre, Royal National Theatre, Almeida Theatre, and Shakespeare's Globe. He was nominated for the 2011 Ian Charleson Award.

In 2015, Needham starred in the short film Stutterer, written and directed by Benjamin Cleary and produced by Serena Armitage and Shan Christopher Ogilvie. The film won Best Live Action Short Film at the 88th Academy Awards.

In January 2017, he appeared in episode 2 of series 4 of the ITV drama series Endeavour, "Canticle", in the role of Dudley Cavan. In March 2017, he played Stanley Kowalski in the BBC Radio 3 production of A Streetcar Named Desire by Tennessee Williams.

Needham played Mr Crowe in the first series of the ITV period drama Sanditon. As of 2022, he plays Larys Strong on the HBO fantasy series House of the Dragon.

References

External links

Living people
1984 births
Alumni of the London Academy of Music and Dramatic Art
English male television actors
People educated at Claremont Fan Court School
People from the Royal Borough of Kingston upon Thames
21st-century English male actors
English male stage actors
Male actors from London